Tour Generali (English: Generali Tower) was a skyscraper planned for construction in the business quarter of La Défense in Courbevoie (Hauts-de-Seine, France). (Note that Generali also owns another prominent high-rise building on Avenue Louise in Brussels, which is also known locally as the "Tour Generali".)

The project was officially initiated on 18 October 2006 and is being built for Italian insurance company Assicurazioni Generali.  Part of the modernisation of La Défense, the project is being constructed by Vinci on the old site of the Iris building, which was completed in 1983. Tour Generali would have an estimated height of 319 meters (1100 feet) from ground level, at a total cost estimate of 500 million euros.

The building would have had 400m² of PV cells, 800m² of solar panels and 18 axial wind turbines on site to produce energy. Other environmental initiatives being taken in the project include mixed-mode ventilation with night purging, use of thermal mass, district heating/cooling and multi-service chilled beams (e.g. ventilation, cooling heating and lighting).

This building was to be constructed as a "green" building, and would have include a wind turbines in its spire, solar panels, and other environmentally friendly elements.

The main entrance of the tower would have been at the 6th level of the tower along the elevated esplanade/promenade, which rises 18 metres above ground level.

The Tour Generali had undergone a redesign and was shortened to 265m, which meant it would have longer held the title of the tallest building in the European Union. The project was cancelled in 2011.

See also 

 Skyscraper
 La Défense
 List of tallest structures in Paris

References

External links 
 MaxFordham.com - Photos

Proposed buildings and structures in France
Generali
Proposed skyscrapers in France
Unbuilt skyscrapers